The 4731st Air Defense Group is a discontinued United States Air Force organization. Its last assignment was with the 64th Air Division of Air Defense Command (ADC) at Ernest Harmon Air Force Base, Newfoundland, Canada, where it was inactivated in 1960. The group was formed in 1957 when ADC assumed responsibility for air defense of Newfoundland from Northeast Air Command and controlled a fighter-interceptor squadron at Harmon and two squadron operating radars at dispersed locations. It was discontinued when Goose Air Defense Sector assumed responsibility for air defense of Newfoundland.

History
The group was formed in 1957 when Air Defense Command (ADC) assumed responsibility for air defense of Newfoundland from Northeast Air Command (NEAC).  It was a tenant organization at Ernest Harmon AFB, a Strategic Air Command base, and whose 4081st Air Base Group assumed host base duties from NEAC.  The group controlled both radar and fighter squadrons in Canada.  Assigned the 61st Fighter-Interceptor Squadron (FIS), flying Northrop F-89 Scorpion aircraft, which was already stationed at Harmon, and two remote Aircraft Control & Warning Squadrons as its operational elements.  These units were transferred from NEAC.  In October 1957, the 61st FIS moved to Wisconsin to replace the 323d FIS, which moved from Wisconsin in a swap of stations.  The 323d FIS, however, flew newer F-102 Delta Daggers, rather than Scorpions.  The 4731st provided air defense of northeast North America.  The group was discontinued in 1960 and subordinate units assigned to Goose Air Defense Sector.

Lineage
 Organized as 4731st Air Defense Group on 1 April 1957
 Discontinued on 1 July 1960

Assignments
 64th Air Division, 1 April 1957 – 1 July 1960

Components
 61st Fighter-Interceptor Squadron, 1 April-15 October 1957
 323d Fighter-Interceptor Squadron, 15 October 1957 – 6 June 1960
 640th Aircraft Control and Warning Squadron, 1 April 1957 – 6 June 1960, Stephenville AS
 642d Aircraft Control and Warning Squadron, 1 April 1957 – 6 June 1960, Red Cliff AS

Stations
 Ernest Harmon AFB, Newfoundland, Canada, 1 April 1957 – 1 July 1960

Aircraft
 F-89D 1957
 F-102A 1957-1959

Commanders
 Col. John F. Daye, Jr., 1958 - ca. 31 Dec 1959
 Maj. Ray E. Arnold, ca. 1 Jan 1960 - 1960

See also
 List of USAF Aerospace Defense Command General Surveillance Radar Stations
 Aerospace Defense Command Fighter Squadrons
 List of United States Air Force aircraft control and warning squadrons

References

Notes

Bibliography

 
 

Further Reading

External links

Four digit groups of the United States Air Force
Air defense groups of the United States Air Force
Aerospace Defense Command units
Military units and formations established in 1957